Joseph E. Dowie (July 15, 1865 – March 4, 1917) was a professional baseball player.  He was an outfielder for one season (1889) with the Baltimore Orioles.  For his career, he compiled a .227 batting average in 75 at-bats, with eight runs batted in.

He was born and later died in New Orleans, Louisiana at the age of 51.

External links

1865 births
1917 deaths
Baltimore Orioles (AA) players
Major League Baseball outfielders
Baseball players from Louisiana
Houston Buffaloes managers
Houston Buffaloes players
Shreveport Giants players
New Orleans Pelicans (baseball) players
Birmingham Barons players
Atlanta Crackers players
19th-century baseball players
Robert E. Lee's players
Savannah (minor league baseball) players